Zhuji railway station is a railway station of Hangchangkun Passenger Railway. The station is located in Zhuji, Shaoxing, Zhejiang, China.

History
The station opened in July 1931.

References

Railway stations in China opened in 1931
Railway stations in Zhejiang
Stations on the Shanghai–Kunming Railway
Zhuji